Dryadaula pactolia is a species of moth in the family Tineidae. It was described by Edward Meyrick in 1901. This species is endemic to New Zealand. but it is occasional in Europe  (British Isles including Ireland , Germany	
Switzerland)	
The larva feeds on the fungus Zasmidium cellare found in wine cellars and breweries.

References

External links
 Image of adult moth
 Dryadaula pactolia at UKmoths
Lepiforum de

Tineidae
Endemic fauna of New Zealand
Moths described in 1901
Moths of New Zealand
Taxa named by Edward Meyrick
Endemic moths of New Zealand